The Champabati River (Assamese: চম্পাৱতী নদী) is a tributary of the Brahmaputra  River in the Indian state of Assam. The Champabati River has three sub tributaries - Bhur River (including Mora Bhur River), Lopani and Dhol pani which are originated from Bhutan hills. 

The Bhur River originates at Gurungdando and flows through Bhur village located in Sidli Tehsil of Chirang district in Assam and after entering into Assam it takes a small river called Patiakhola. Then the Bhur River turned into a narrow sandy form and flows through Manas National Park and arrives at Shantipur and from Shantipur the Bhur river flows in south west direction and entered into Bengtal Sanctuary taking Khungrung River at its right in Hantupara. After  Bengtal Sanctuary, the Bhur river flows  to south taking the name of Baahbari River. Then the Bhur River flows through  the Saalbari Bhurpar and  takes two sub-tributaries from phoolkumari River in its both sides and meets Dholpani River and it finally takes the name of Champabati River.

The Dholpani river also originates in Bhutan hills and flows in Bhutan-India border before it takes two sub-tributaries Arne Khola river and Tiniabadhi river and finally meets the Champabati  river. 

The Lopani river flows through Chirang forest and takes a tributary from Jhora Beel before it meets the Dholpani river. Dholpani and Lopani meets together and  take the name of Champabati river. 

The Champabati river divides into two parts after crossing the National Highway 31C and finally joins the Brahmaputra River near Chapar of Dhubri district.

References 

Rivers of Assam
Rivers of India